was a Japanese actor best known internationally for his role as Commander Minoru Genda in the 1970 Japanese-American war epic Tora! Tora! Tora!. In addition, Mihashi was known for his roles in Akira Kurosawa's The Bad Sleep Well, The Human Vapor, Chūshingura: Hana no Maki, Yuki no Maki, High and Low, None but the Brave and the lead role as agent Jiro Kitami in Kokusai himitsu keisatsu: Kagi no kagi, which was reedited in the US as What's Up, Tiger Lily? Mihashi's looks were compared to those of Cary Grant's. He died in 2004 of Myocardial infarction.

Selected filmography

Film

 Nishijin no shimai (1952) - Hiroshi Yasui
 Shino machi o nogarete (1952) - Yosaburo Sugi
 Dôkoku (1952)
 Hawai no yoru (1953)
 Sincerity (1953) - Tôru Shimura
 Jinanbo (1953)
 Shin Tokyo koshin-kyoku (1953) - Kazuo Kiriyama
 Gutei kenkei (1953)
 Tôkyô madamu to Ôsaka fujin (1953) - Mitsuo Itô
 Kyûkon sannin musume (1954) - Kôzô Wakabayashi
 Kimi no na wa: Dai-san-bu (1954)
 Kimi ni chikaishi (1954) - Kunihiko Yada
 Daigaku wa detakeredo (1955)
 Ai no onimotsu (1955)
 Till We Meet Again (1955) - Kappei Ohnuki
 The Heart (1955) - Kaji
 Ginza 24 chou (1955) - Kan Mimurodo - Konî
 Haha naki ko (1955) - Sugimoto, policeman
 The Burmese Harp (1956) - Defense Commander
 The Balloon (1956) - Keikichi Murakami
 Hi no tori (1956)
 Suzaki Paradise: Red Light (1956) - Yoshiji, Tsutae's husband
 Waga machi (1956)
 Natsu no arashi (1956) - Keiji Akimoto
 Ueru tamashii (1956) - Retsu Tachibana
 Zoku ueru tamashii (1956) - Retsu Tachibana
 Otemba san'nin shimai: Odoru taiyô (1957) - Shintarô Taki
 Fukushû wa dare ga yaru (1957) - Yûkichi Ono / Yûzô Ôkawa
 Muhô ichidai (1957) - Kanta Waniguchi
 Sono yoru no himegoto (1957) - Yonosuke Miyamoto
 Shori-sha (1957)
 Kekkon no subete (1958)
 Onna de aru koto (1958) - Goro
 Gurama-to no yuwaku (1959) - Urumeru
 Submarine I-57 Will Not Surrender (1959)
 Kaoyaku to bakudan musume (1959) - Kenji Ôta
 Samurai to oneechan (1960) - Takusan Mô
 Dâisan hâtobanô kêtto (1960) - Detective Yoneyama
 Storm Over the Pacific (1960)
 Robo no ishi (1960) - Tsugino
 Yoru no nagare (1960)
 The Bad Sleep Well (1960) - Tatsuo Iwabuchi
 'Akasaka no shimai' yori: yoru no hada (1960) - Tôzô Nakahira
 The Human Vapor (1960) - Detective Okamoto
 Sararîman Chûshingura (1960) - Sadagoro
 Ankokugai no dankon (1961) - Azuma, police detective
 Ginza no koibitotachi (1961)
 Zoku sararîman Chûshingura (1961) - Sadagoro
 Playboy President (1961) - Honda
 Ai to honoho to (1961) - Izaki
 Dangai no ketto (1961)
 Procurer of Hell (1961) - Osamu Tobe
 Kaei (1961)
 Witness Killed (1961) - Jiro
 Ai no uzu shio (1962)
 Onna no za (1962) - Hashimoto Masaaki, Michiko no otto
 Doburoku no Tatsu (1962) - Shaguma the Foreman
 Chushingura (1962) - Yasubei Horibe
 Ankokugai no kiba (1962)
 Attack Squadron! (1963)
 High and Low (1963) - Kawanishi - Gondo's Secretary
 Minami no shima ni yuki ga furu (1963)
 Legacy of the 500,000 (1963) - Captain Keigo Gunji
 Dokuritsu kikanjûtai imada shagekichu (1963)
 Kokusai himitsu keisatsu: shirei dai hachigo (1963) - Jiro Kitami
 Norainu sakusen (1963)
 Kokusai himitsu keisatsu: Tora no kiba (1964) - Jiro Kitami
 Kyô mo ware ôzora ni ari (1964)
 Zoku wakai kisetsu (1964)
 Jigoku sakusen (1964)
 Kokusai himitsu keisatsu: Kayaku no taru (1964) - Jiro Kitami
 Danchi: Nanatsu no taizai (1964) - Sôhei Kimura
 None But the Brave (1965) - Lt. Kuroki
 Ankokugai gekitotsu sakusen (1965) - Taro
 Kokusai himitsu keisatsu: Kagi no kagi (1965) - Jiro Kitami
 The Stranger Within a Woman (1966) - Ryukichi Sugimoto
 Kiganjô no bôken (1966) - The King
 Doto ichiman kairi (1966) - Isaku Yano
 The Killing Bottle (1967) - Jiro Kitami
 Sasaki Kojiro (1967) - Jubee Minamiya
 Shin Abashiri Bangaichi (1968) - Isamu Gunji
 Yaju no fukkatsu (1969)
 Nippon dabi katsukyu (1970)
 The Militarists (1970) - Takijirō Ōnishi
 Tora! Tora! Tora! (1970) - Commander Minoru Genda
 Shin abashiri bangaichi: Arashi yobu shiretoko-misaki (1971)
 Kindaichi Kosuke no boken (1979)
 Harukanaru sôro (1980) - Risaburo Oshima
 Imperial Navy (1981)
 Rokumeikan (1986) - Hirobumi Ito
 Wasurerarenu hitobito (2000) - Kijima
 Dolls (2002) - Hiro, the Boss
 Casshern (2004) - Dr. Furoi (final film role)

Television
Kyotaro Nishimura Travel Mystery (1981-1999) - Inspector Totsugawa
Manten (2002-2003)

References

External links
 
 

1923 births
2004 deaths
Male actors from Tokyo
Japanese male film actors
20th-century Japanese male actors
21st-century Japanese male actors